John Floyer may refer to:

 John Floyer (physician) (1649–1734), English physician and author
 John Floyer (Tamworth MP) (c1681–1762), English politician, MP for Tamworth 1741–42
 John Floyer (Dorset MP) (1811–1887), English politician, MP for Dorset 1846–67 and 1864–95